Logan Herbert Roots D.D. (July 27, 1870 – September 23, 1945) was an American missionary to China and from 1904 to 1925 served as the Episcopal Bishop of Hankow.

Early life and path to ordination
Born in Tamaroa, Illinois he attended Harvard College graduating with an A.B. Degree in 1891. At Harvard he was a member of Delta Upsilon fraternity. Roots later attended the Episcopal Theological School in Cambridge, graduating in 1896 and was subsequently ordained deacon.

Missionary work in China
In the autumn of 1896 Roots crossed the Pacific to start his new life as a church missionary in China.  His initial assignment was as an English instructor at the Boone School in Wuchang.

Roots was consecrated at Emmanuel Church in Boston on November 14, 1904 as the second Bishop of Hankow, succeeding James Addison Ingle. The Protestant Episcopal Church Mission in Hankow underwent severe challenges during Roots' period as bishop; Hankow being captured in 1912 during the Xinhai Revolution and the adjacent district of Wuhan becoming one of the main battlegrounds between the imperial and revolutionary forces. St. Paul's Cathedral in Hankow was used as a hospital to treat the battle wounded and normal church activity was very much restricted.

Roots was in turn succeeded as bishop in 1925 by Alfred A. Gilman.

Roots was awarded an Honorary D.D. by both the University of the South and Harvard University. He died in 1945 on Mackinac Island, where he is buried.

See also 

Protestant missions in China 1807-1953
Christianity in China
List of Delta Upsilon alumni

References 
 John McCook Roots, Warrior's Testament memorial volume (Los Angeles: Parker and Company, no date)

External links 
The Bishops of the American Church Mission in China (1908)

Christian missions in China
People from Perry County, Illinois
1870 births
1945 deaths
20th-century Anglican bishops in China
Bishops of the Episcopal Church (United States)
Harvard College alumni
Episcopal bishops of Hankow
20th-century American clergy